The Bugut inscription is a multi-lingual inscription first discovered in Ikh-Tamir sum of Arkhangai Province, Mongolia. The inscription is dated to 584 CE and was dedicated to Taspar Khagan (reigned 572–581) the fourth Khagan of the Turkic Khaganate. The inscription is in the form of a monumental wolf-crowned stele 198 cm high that sits on a turtle base 47 cm high. The front, right and left side of the stele has a Sogdian inscription written with Sogdian alphabet. The back side has a possibly Ruanruan inscription written with Brahmi script. The original location of the inscription on the west bank of the Bayantsagaan river, a tributary of the North Tamir river, shows evidence of a walled complex. The wall embankment is 59mx30m with an inner moat 4.5m wide and 2m deep. In the center of the walled complex was a temple whose wooden pillars and roof tiles were still visible on the ground. Only a few brick fragments were found. The inscription itself was found within the walls on a square platform 7.5mx7.5m made of layered stones.

Historical context

The stele was erected in 584 CE with a latest date of 587 CE. It is dedicated to Taspar Khagan who is also called Tatpar Khagan. By this time the Turkic Khaganate stretched from Manchuria to the Black Sea. It controlled the Silk Road while its imperial seat of power was in central Mongolia. The Turkic Khaganate replaced their previous overlords the Rouran Khaganate (also called Ruanruan) in 552 with the help of the Western Wei. The Gokturks proceeded to defeat the Hepthalites with the help of the Sasanian Empire of Persia in 560 CE. The defeat of the Rouran and Hephthalites and their pursuit by the Turks precipitated the migration of the Avars into Eastern Europe. Charlemagne would ultimately accept their surrender in 798 at Aachen and send one native chief, baptised Abraham, back to Avaria with the ancient title of khagan. The Turks allied with the Byzantine Empire against the Sasanians. Byzantine envoy Zemarchus visited Istemi Khagan in the Altai Mountains (Golden Mountains) in 569. The Sogdian language of the inscriptions reflects the prominence of Sogdians on the Silk Road. Sogdians were East Iranians from Sogdia, one of the satrapies of the Achaemenid Empire. The Mongolic Ruanruan inscription reflects the influence of the previous Rouran Khaganate. The title Khagan was first used by the Rourans who were an offshoot of the Xianbei similar to the Tuoba, Khitan, Tuyuhun and Shiwei (Mongols). Some Rouran nobility were Buddhists. The wolf at the top of the stele reflects the Turks' belief in their origin from a wolf like the Mongols. The vertical orientation of the inscriptions and the turtle base reflects cultural influence from China. The Inscription of Hüis Tolgoi is another inscription found in Mongolia, dated to 604 to 620 CE, with a Brahmi Mongolic text.

Sogdian inscription

The Sogdian inscription has the following text:

This was translated into English by Sergej G. Kljaštornyj and Vladimir A. Livšic:

Brahmi Mongolic inscription
This is Alexander Vovin's tentative translation.

References

6th-century inscriptions
Sogdian language
Inscriptions
Steles
Göktürk inscriptions
Rouran